A potato chip (North American English; often just chip) or crisp (British and Irish English) is a thin slice of potato that has been deep fried, baked, or air fried until crunchy. They are commonly served as a snack, side dish, or appetizer. The basic chips are cooked and salted; additional varieties are manufactured using various flavorings and ingredients including herbs, spices, cheeses, other natural flavors, artificial flavors, and additives.

Potato chips form a large part of the snack food and convenience food market in Western countries. The global potato chip market generated total revenue of US$16.49 billion in 2005. This accounted for 35.5% of the total savory snacks market in that year ($46.1 billion).

History 

The earliest known recipe for something similar to today's potato chips is in William Kitchiner's book The Cook's Oracle published in 1817, which was a bestseller in the United Kingdom and the United States. The 1822 edition's recipe for "Potatoes fried in Slices or Shavings" reads "peel large potatoes... cut them in shavings round and round, as you would peel a lemon; dry them well in a clean cloth, and fry them in lard or dripping". An 1825 British book about French cookery calls them "Pommes de Terre frites" (second recipe) and calls for thin slices of potato fried in "clarified butter or goose dripping", drained and sprinkled with salt. Early recipes for potato chips in the US are found in Mary Randolph's Virginia House-Wife (1824) and in N.K.M. Lee's Cook's Own Book (1832), both of which explicitly cite Kitchiner.

A legend associates the creation of potato chips with Saratoga Springs, New York, decades later than the first recorded recipe. By the late nineteenth century, a popular version of the story attributed the dish to George Crum, a cook at Moon's Lake House who was trying to appease an unhappy customer on August 24, 1853. The customer kept sending back his French-fried potatoes, complaining that they were too thick, too "soggy", or not salted enough. Frustrated, Crum sliced several potatoes extremely thin, fried them to a crisp, and seasoned them with extra salt. To his surprise, the customer loved them. They soon came to be called "Saratoga Chips", a name that persisted into the mid-twentieth century. A version of this story was popularized in a 1973 national advertising campaign by St. Regis Paper Company which manufactured packaging for chips, claiming that Crum's customer was Cornelius Vanderbilt. Crum was already renowned as a chef at the time, and he owned a lakeside restaurant by 1860 which he called Crum's House. The "Saratoga Chips" brand name still exists today.

Production 

In the 20th century, potato chips spread beyond chef-cooked restaurant fare and began to be mass-produced for home consumption. The Dayton, Ohio-based Mikesell's Potato Chip Company, founded in 1910, identifies as the "oldest potato chip company in the United States". New Hampshire-based Granite State Potato Chip Factory, founded in 1905 and in operation until 2007, was one of America's first potato chip manufacturers.

Flavoring 

In an idea originated by the Smiths Potato Crisps Company Ltd, formed in 1920, Frank Smith packaged a twist of salt with his chips in greaseproof paper bags, which were sold around London. The potato chip remained otherwise unseasoned until an important scientific development in the 1950s. After English biochemists Archer Martin and Richard Synge received a Nobel Prize for inventing partition chromatography in 1952, food scientists began to develop flavors via a gas chromatograph. After some trial and error, in 1954, Joe "Spud" Murphy, the owner of the Irish crisps company Tayto, and his employee Seamus Burke, produced the world's first seasoned chips: Cheese & Onion. Companies worldwide sought to buy the rights to Tayto's technique. Walkers of Leicester, England produced Cheese & Onion the same year. Golden Wonder (Smith’s main competitor at the time) would also produce Cheese & Onion, and Smith’s countered with Salt & Vinegar (tested first by their north-east England subsidiary Tudor) which launched nationally in 1967, starting a two-decade-long flavour war.

The first flavored chips in the United States, barbecue flavor, were being manufactured and sold by 1954. In 1958, Herr's was the first company to introduce barbecue-flavored potato chips in Pennsylvania.

Packaging 

Chips sold in markets were usually sold in tins or scooped out of storefront glass bins and delivered by horse and wagon. Early potato chip bags were wax paper with the ends ironed or stapled together. At first, potato chips were packaged in barrels or tins, which left chips at the bottom stale and crumbled.

In the 1920s, Laura Scudder, an entrepreneur in Monterey Park, California, started having her workers take home sheets of wax paper to iron into the form of bags, which were filled with chips at her factory the next day. This pioneering method reduced crumbling and kept the chips fresh and crisp longer. This innovation, along with the invention of cellophane, allowed potato chips to become a mass-market product. Today, chips are packaged in plastic bags, with nitrogen gas blown in prior to sealing to lengthen shelf life, and provide protection against crushing.

Kettle-cooked chips 

Industrial advances resulted in a shift to production by a continuous process, running the chips through a vat of hot oil and drying them in a conveyor process.

Some small producers continued to use a batch process, notably in Maui. In 1980, inspired by the Maui Chip, an entrepreneur started Cape Cod Potato Chips to produce thicker, batch-cooked "Hawaiian style" potato chips, which came to be known as kettle-style (US) or hand-cooked (UK) chips and became a premium, "gourmet" item. Kettle chips are thicker and the surface starch is not rinsed off, resulting in a style of chip called "hard-bite".

Nomenclature 

Little consistency exists in the English-speaking world for the name of this food. North American English uses "chips", though Canadians may also call French fries, especially thick ones, "chips" as well. "Crisps" may be used for thin fried slices made from potato paste. An example of this type of snack is Pringles, which chooses to market their product as "potato crisps" even in the United States.

In the United Kingdom and Ireland, "crisps" are potato chips which are eaten at room temperature, whilst "chips" are similar to french fries (as in "fish and chips") and are served hot. In Australia, some parts of South Africa, New Zealand, India, and the West Indies, especially in Barbados, both forms of potato product are simply known as "chips", as are the larger "home-style" variety. In the north of New Zealand, they are sometimes affectionately known as "chippies"; however, they are marketed as "chips" throughout the country. In Australia and New Zealand, a distinction is sometimes made between "hot chips" (fried potatoes) and "chips" or "potato chips". In Bangladesh, they are generally known as "chip" or "chips", and much less frequently as "crisps" (pronounced "kirisp") and locally, alu bhaja (for their similarity to the fried potato dish, bhajji).

In German-speaking countries (Austria, Germany: "Kartoffelchips", often shortened to "Chips"; Switzerland: "Pommes Chips") and in countries of the former Yugoslavia, fried thin potato slices are known as "chips" (locally pronounced very similarly to the English pronunciation), with a clear distinction from French fries.

Health concerns 

Most potato chips contain high levels of sodium, from salt. This has been linked to health issues such as high blood pressure. However, researchers at Queen Mary University of London in 2004 have noted that a small "bag of ready-salted crisps" contains less salt than a serving of many breakfast cereals, including "every brand of cornflakes on sale in the UK."

Some potato chip companies have responded to the long-standing concerns by investing in research and development to modify existing recipes and create health-conscious products. PepsiCo research shows that about 80% of salt on chips is not sensed by the tongue before being swallowed. Frito-Lay spent $414 million in 2009 on product development, including development of salt crystals that would reduce the salt content of Lay's potato chips without adversely affecting flavor.

Unsalted chips are available, e.g. the longstanding British brand Salt 'n' Shake, whose chips are not seasoned, but instead include a small salt sachet in the bag for seasoning to taste. Many other popular brands in the United States, such as Frito-Lay, also offer such a product.

One health scare related to potato chips focused on acrylamide, which is produced when potatoes are fried or baked at high temperatures. This discovery in 2002 led to international health concerns. Subsequent research has however found that it is not likely that the acrylamides in burnt or well-cooked food cause cancer in humans; Cancer Research UK categorizes the idea that burnt food causes cancer as a "myth".

In August 2008, California Attorney General Jerry Brown announced a settlement with Frito-Lay, Kettle Foods, and Lance Inc., the makers of Cape Cod Potato Chips, for violating the state's Safe Drinking Water and Toxic Enforcement Act. The state had alleged in 2005 that potato chips from these companies failed to document that they contained high levels of acrylamide, which is listed by California since the 1990s as a carcinogen. These companies paid fines and agreed to reduce acrylamide levels to be under 275 parts per billion. Many potato chip manufacturers attempt to remove burned and thus potentially acrylamide-rich chips before the packaging process. Large scanners are used to eliminate chips worst affected by heat.

Regional varieties

Americas 

In the United States, major regional brands include Jays, Better Made, Old Dutch, and Utz. Flavorings include variations of barbecue, as well as sour cream and onion, sour cream and cheddar, salt and vinegar, ranch, jalapeño and cheese. Zapp's, makes kettle-cooked chips using regional flavors such as Crawtator, Cajun dill, Voodoo, and Creole onion.

In Canada, seasonings include the unique all-dressed, as well as dill pickle, jalapeño, ketchup, barbecue, sour cream and onion, and salt and vinegar. Loblaw, Canada's largest food retailer, offers unusual flavors such as poutine, maple bacon, Jamaican jerk chicken, Greek feta and olive, ballpark hot dog, and barbecue baby back ribs.

In Colombia, lemon, chicken, chorizo, and sirloin steak with mushroom sauce flavored potato chips are sold.

Europe 

In the United Kingdom, Walkers makes crisps with popular flavours as Prawn Cocktail, Beef and Onion, Roast Chicken, Smoky Bacon, Worcester Sauce, Pickled Onion, and Tomato Ketchup, and exotic flavors Thai sweet chili, roast pork and creamy mustard sauce, chicken with Italian herbs, Spicy Sriracha, BBQ Pulled Pork, sea salt and cider vinegar, spicy and aromatic curry, turkey and bacon, caramelized onion and sweet balsamic vinegar, Stilton and cranberry. In Ireland, the word "Tayto" is synonymous with potato chips after the Tayto brand, and can be used to describe all varieties of chips, including those not produced by Tayto. Hunky Dorys and King are other popular Irish brands.

In Germany, Belgium and the Netherlands, only two flavors were traditionally available, red paprika (Paprika, sometimes also called ungarisch (from "Hungarian")) and salted (gesalzen). These are still by far the most common and popular types, but some vendors have started flavors such as sour cream and onion, cheese, oriental, or more exotic seasonings like "Chakalaka", "Currywurst", "Pommes" (french fries), "Rot-weiss" (red and white: french fries with tomato ketchup and mayonnaise).

In Russia, the Russkaya Kartoshka brand of chips claim reduced content of oil in their curled (C-shaped, nearly ball-shaped) chips, and offers flavors like grilled salmon, shrimp and "Kamchatka's crab", that are unique seafood-themed flavors of potato chips mass-produced in Russia. Lay's offers crab-flavored and no-cream green onion flavored chips as ones made uniquely for Russian market. Lay's "Iz pechi" (literally "from the stove") line of less-oiled chips also include crab flavor. "Just Brutal" brand has pitch-black chips, where the flavors are "vinegar" and "Thai sweet pepper".

Asia 

In Japan, flavors include norishio (nori and salt), consommé, wasabi, soy sauce and butter, garlic, plum, barbecue, pizza, mayonnaise, and black pepper. Chili, scallop with butter, teriyaki, takoyaki, and yakitori chip flavors are also available. Major manufacturers include Calbee and Koikeya. In Hong Kong, the two prominent potato chips are the spicy "Ethnican" variety by Calbee, and barbecue by Jack 'n Jill.

In Indonesia, potato chips are commonly called kripik kentang and traditionally fell under the kripik category. The major brands are Indofood's Chitato (since 1990s) and Lay's (Frito-Lay). In 2014, Japan's Calbee and Indonesia's Wings Food formed Calbeewings, a joint venture and marketed Potabee potato chips offering two flavors: beef BBQ and grilled seaweed. Lay's potato chips sold in Indonesia are available in six flavors: honey butter, sour cream and onion, nori seaweed, beef barbecue, classic salty, and salmon teriyaki flavors. In 2018 Chitato launched three unusual flavors: beef rendang, fried crab golden egg yolk, and mango sticky rice.

Similar foods 

Another food made from potatoes, notably the Pringles and Lay's Stax brands, is made by extruding or pressing a dough made from dehydrated potato flour into the desired shape before frying. This makes a product that is uniform in size and shape, which allows them to be stacked and packaged in rigid cardboard or plastic canisters. Pringles are officially branded as "potato crisps" in the US. Pringles may be termed "potato chips" in Britain, to distinguish them from traditional "crisps", but do not meet the definition or standard of identity for potato chips. Munchos, another brand that uses the term "potato crisps", has deep air pockets in its chips that give it a curved shape, though the chips themselves resemble regular bagged chips.

An additional product similar to potato chips exists in the form of "potato sticks", also called "shoestring potatoes". These are made as extremely thin (2 to 3 mm) versions of the popular French fry but are fried in the manner of regular salted potato chips. A hickory-smoke-flavored version is popular in Canada, going by the vending machine name "Hickory Sticks". Potato sticks are typically packaged in rigid containers, although some manufacturers use flexible pouches, similar to potato chip bags. Potato sticks were originally packed in hermetically sealed steel cans. In the 1960s, manufacturers switched to the less expensive composite canister (similar to the Pringles container). Reckitt Benckiser was a market leader in this category under the Durkee Potato Stix and French's Potato Sticks names but exited the business in 2008. In 2014, French's reentered the market. A larger variant (about 1 cm thick) made with dehydrated potatoes is marketed as Andy Capp's Pub Fries, using the theme of a long-running British comic strip, which are baked and sold in a variety of flavors. Walkers make a similar product (using the Smiths brand) called "Chipsticks" which are sold in ready-salted and salt and vinegar flavors.

Some companies have also marketed baked potato chips as an alternative with lower fat content. Additionally, some varieties of fat-free chips have been made using artificial, and indigestible, fat substitutes. These became well known in the media when an ingredient many contained, Olestra, was linked in some individuals to abdominal discomfort and loose stools.

Many other products might be called "crisps" in Britain, but would not be classed as "potato chips" because they are not made with potato or are not chipped (for example, Wotsits, Quavers, Skips, Hula Hoops, and Monster Munch).

Sweet potato chips are eaten in Korea, New Zealand, and Japan; parsnip, beetroot, and carrot crisps are available in the United Kingdom. India is famous for a large number of localized 'chips shops', selling not only potato chips, but also other varieties such as plantain chips, tapioca chips, yam chips, and even carrot chips. Plantain chips, also known as chifles or tostones, are also sold in the Western Hemisphere from Canada to Chile. In the Philippines, banana chips can be found sold at local stores. In Kenya, chips are made from arrowroot and cassava. In the United Kingdom, Sweden, Finland, and Australia, a new variety of Pringles made from rice has been released and marketed as lower in fat than its potato counterparts.

See also 

 Chips and dip
 List of deep fried foods
 List of potato dishes
 Papadum
 Vegetable chips

References

Further reading 

 Banham, Rayner (1977) "The Crisp at the Crossroads", in P. Barker (ed) Arts in Society. London: Fontana.
 : Origins of potato chips.

External links 

American inventions
British inventions
1822 introductions
1853 introductions
British cuisine
Convenience foods
Deep fried foods
Potato dishes
American snack foods